Nathan and Olive Boone Homestead State Historic Site, located two miles north of Ash Grove, Missouri, is a state-owned property that preserves the home built in 1837 by Nathan Boone, the youngest child of Daniel Boone. The Nathan Boone House, which was listed on the National Register of Historic Places in 1969, is a -story "classic" saddle-bag pioneer log house, constructed of hand-hewn oak log walls that rest on a stone foundation. Established in 1991, the historic site offers an interpretive trail plus tours of the home and cemetery.

See also
Boone's Lick State Historic Site

References

External links
 Nathan Boone Homestead State Historic Site Missouri Department of Natural Resources

Missouri State Historic Sites
Historic house museums in Missouri
Protected areas established in 1991
Museums in Greene County, Missouri
Boone
Protected areas of Greene County, Missouri
1991 establishments in Missouri
Houses on the National Register of Historic Places in Missouri
Houses completed in 1837
National Register of Historic Places in Greene County, Missouri